

The Krantzkloof Nature Reserve, managed by Ezemvelo KZN Wildlife, conserves 668 ha of the Molweni (Zulu: 'mutual greetings') and Nkutu River gorges that incise the sandstone Kloof plateau in KwaZulu-Natal, South Africa. The reserve conserves coastal scarp forest, sourveld grassland, a cliff face biotope, and aquatic environments along its rivers. Scarp forest is a threatened forest type, protected by South Africa's forests act of 1998, while the grassland is classified as KwaZulu-Natal sandstone sourveld, the most threatened terrestrial habitat in the Durban metropole. The reserve was established in 1950 and was augmented by land donations as late as 1999.

Setting
The reserve is situated at 140 to 520 m.a.s.l, and borders on suburbs, informal settlements, and in some of the catchment areas, on privately owned conservancies. The Kloof conservancy manages the Ronald's Kloof stream project, which effectively adds 5 ha to the reserve. The Springside and Iphithi Nature Reserves, in addition to the Everton conservancy, conserve natural remnants of the Molweni and Iphithi rivers' upper catchment.

The forested Molweni gorge divides the residential suburbs of Kloof and Forest Hills, and is intersected by Kloof Falls Road. This road provides access to the main Kloof Falls picnic site, from where walking trails diverge in both the upstream and downstream directions. The Molweni and Nkutu rivers converge to join 1 km outside the reserve, and some 2 km from the Umgeni. The reserve and conservancies are included in Durban's open space system, D’MOSS.

The reserve is situated on Natal group sandstone of the Cambrian to Ordovician periods, some 490 million years old, and artifacts recovered from its rock shelters indicate that it was once inhabited by early Iron Age people.

Wildlife

Some 25 amphibian, 255 bird, 50 mammal, 36 reptile, 150 butterfly and 274 tree species have been recorded in the Gorge or its vicinity. The natural vegetation is under pressure from numerous invasive species, while some tree species are vulnerable to muti-collecting practices in the greater Durban area.

Mammals

Blue duiker and bushbuck were released into the reserve in 1970 and 1971. Red duiker, then regionally extinct, was also introduced but did not persist, while the introduced baboons had to be eradicated after causing a nuisance to nearby residents. Common duiker occurs and the last brown greater galagos of the Durban metropole are resident. Small carnivores include water, slender, white-tailed, Egyptian and banded mongoose, Cape genet, caracal and water monitor. Its rocky grassland areas offer protection to the Natal red rock hare, a species with declining numbers.

Birds
Some 255 bird species have been recorded in the reserve. The three pairs of crowned eagles that nest in the reserve prey on dassies, monkeys and hadeda ibis. Wahlberg's eagle, lanner and peregrine falcons all nest in the lower gorge. Secretive birds like broadbill, grey cuckooshrike, Narina trogon, emerald cuckoo and wood-owl all occur, but are more likely to be heard than seen. Winter migrants include chorister robin-chat, white-starred robin, yellow-throated warbler and the rare spotted ground-thrush. Trumpeter and crowned hornbills are numerous and conspicuous. Knysna turaco (subsp. corythaix) is not found elsewhere in the Durban metropole, and occurs alongside the more numerous purple-crested turaco. Late summer seed of broad-leaved setaria attract green twinspot, grey waxbill, swee waxbill and red-backed mannikin. Plain-backed pipit is regularly present after grassland burns, while bat hawk has been noted at dusk.

Invertebrates
The endangered ruby-footed black millipede, Doratogonus rubipodus, first collected in 1996, is only known from Krantzkloof and the nearby Giba gorge.

Plants

The reserve is home to a high diversity of plants including various rare species. These include cycads of the Encephalartos and Stangeria genera. The E. natalensis cycads of Krantzkloof represent one of several distinguishable varieties. A few specimens of the very rare Natal sandstone quince, Dahlgrenodendron natalense, are present. A relict population of Brachystelma natalense is conserved here, besides the only South African population of the red sunbird bush, Metarungia pubinervia. The vulnerable aquatic plant Hydrostachys polymorpha is found on one of the Molweni's waterfalls, while the Bootlace lily, Drimia flagellaris, discovered in 2005, is endemic to the reserve's cliff faces. The distinctive subspecies floribunda of Crassula multicava is endemic to scarp forest and gorge bottoms of this area. It is home to several species of African violet of the genus Streptocarpus, and includes the core range of the nominate subspecies of S. molweniensis, a vulnerable and declining species only described in 1996. Besides the latter, S. haygarthii, S. grandis, S. prolixus and the nominate subspecies of S. polyanthus are also to be found.

Facilities and access
The reserve does not offer any accommodation or camping, but the Kranztkloof Conference Centre alongside Kloof Falls road is available for hire for meetings, conferences or social events of up to 70 people. The Kloof Falls picnic site is open daily from sunrise to sunset at a fee of R40 per person, or R20 per child under 12 years (Nov 2018). Rhino card holders have free access, but SanParks Wild Cards are expressly not accepted. The Valley Drive picnic site is open on weekends or by prior arrangement. Pets are not allowed in the reserve. Trail running events, organised by the Kloof Conservancy, benefit the projects of the reserve's honorary officers. Selected areas of the gorge are accessible to rock climbers only, with the requirement that they sign a climbing register and pay the entrance fee when entering and leaving.

Walking trails

Exploration of the reserve is facilitated by numerous walking trails, more than 20 km in aggregate. They are designated as the red (Nkutu Falls, 1.25 hrs), yellow (Molweni, 4.5 hrs), green (Ntombeni, 1 hr), blue (Longshadows, 1.5 hrs), orange (Beacon, 1 hr), black (Mpiti, 45 min) and white (2 hrs) trails. A trail map is available for R20 at either of the picnic sites.

The Nkutu Falls trail allows a hiker to reach the base of the Nkutu Falls and return to the Nkutu picnic site in 30 minutes. The strenuous Molweni trail descends some 350 meters to the bottom of the gorge, and allows a visitor to reach the bottom of the 90m high Kloof Falls before retracing. The Ntombeni trail passes through level grassland to arrive at a site called "The Crack" that allows vistas of the lower gorge. The Longshadows trail follows the Molweni river upstream in cool, level forest. The Beacon trail diverges from the Molweni trail to take the hiker along level grassland above the cliff faces. The white trail winds up a steep slope, crosses Bridle Road to re-enter the reserve, and traces the escarpment edge before descending to the waterfall in the nKonka river. 

Though incidents are rare, visitors have been advised that remote trails are unsafe due to uneven terrain, former crime incidents, or the possibility of getting lost. Guided walks are conducted on the 1st and 3rd Sunday of each month.

Site locations

Bridle Road view site  - closed for management reasons - Dec 2017
Kloof Falls (Main) picnic site 
mPhiti waterfall (black trail) 
nKonka waterfall (white trail) 
Nkutu (Valley Drive) picnic site 
Rumdoodle crevasse (climbing site) 
Uve Road parking area

References

Protected areas of KwaZulu-Natal